Acianthera scalpricaulis is a species of orchid plant native to Ecuador.

References 

scalpricaulis
Flora of Ecuador